Gregory Robert Smith (born 16 July 1968) is a Fijian former rugby union player. He played for Japan as flanker.

Career
Smith first played for Japan on 3 May 1998, against Canada at the Chichibunomiya Rugby Stadium. He was present in the 1999 Rugby World Cup roster, where he played all the 3 matches in the tournament, against  Samoa, Wales and Argentina, at the Millennium Stadium, Cardiff, on 16 October, which would be his last international cap. Throughout all his career, Smith earned 17 caps, 15 points and 3 tries scored.  At club level, he played for Canterbury in the NPC and then, he moved in Japan to play for the Toyota Motors club.

Notes

External links
Greg R. Smith at New Zealand Rugby History
Greg Smith international stats

1968 births
Living people
Japanese rugby union players
Rugby union flankers
Fijian expatriates in New Zealand
Toyota Verblitz players
Fijian expatriates in Japan
Japan international rugby union players